The 1931 Monaco Grand Prix was a Grand Prix motor race held at the Circuit de Monaco on 19 April 1931.

With 16 Bugattis in a field of 23 cars, the event was close to being a single-make race. Among the 16 were four factory-team Type 51s driven by the Monegasque Louis Chiron, the Italian Achille Varzi and the French Albert Divo and Guy Bouriat. The real challenge came from the Maserati 8C 2500's driven by René Dreyfus, the Italian Luigi Fagioli and Clemente Bondietti. Rudolf Caracciola with his huge Mercedes SSKL (Super Sport Short Light-Weight) was uncompetitive as his larger car performed poorly around the tight Monaco track.

The race was between the blue cars from Molsheim and the red ones from Modena. When the start flag dropped it was Rene Dreyfus in his red Maserati who led into St. Devote, only to be passed by 'Williams' on the hill to the Casino, but his lead was short-lived as the Brit was sidelined by a broken valve spring, and his race was over. Achille Varzi and Caracciola started closing on Dreyfus and Varzi managed to overtake the Frenchman on the 7th lap. Caracciola struggled with a slipping clutch that gave in on lap 53.

Starting slowly, Louis Chiron eventually displayed his talents; gaining back ground with a new lap record time. He caught up with all his opponents and left them behind. Chiron, a native of Monaco, finished the race some 5 minutes ahead of Luigi Fagioli.

Jean Bugatti could not control his joy and jumped over the parapet of the bleachers and fell into Louis Chiron's arms. For the Monegasque, this Monaco Grand Prix victory really confirmed his reputation.

Entries

Starting grid

Note: grid slots were determined by drawing lots (Birkin and Ivanowski had provisionally been due to start on the first and seventh row, respectively).

Classification

Race

References

External links

Monaco
Monaco Grand Prix
Grand Prix